Mohamed Elmi Abar is a Djiboutian professional football manager. From May to October 2008 he coached Djibouti national football team.

References

External links 
Profile at Soccerpunter.com
Profile at Soccerway.com

Year of birth missing (living people)
Living people
Djiboutian football managers
Djibouti national football team managers
Place of birth missing (living people)